Gentry O. Smith (born 1959) is an American foreign service officer serving as Assistant Secretary of State for Diplomatic Security since August 2021. From June 2015 to January 2017, he was Director of the Office of Foreign Missions.

Early life and education
Smith was born to two schoolteachers in Halifax County, North Carolina. He attended Weldon High School in Weldon, North Carolina. He ran track and field and played wide receiver and defensive end on the school's football team. He earned a Bachelor of Arts degree in political science from North Carolina State University.

Career
Smith served as a police officer in the Raleigh Police Department for four years, through 1987, when he went to work for the United States Department of State as a special agent in the Diplomatic Security Service.

In 2000, he was deputy regional security officer in Cairo. In 2004, he was regional security officer in Tokyo. He was director of the Office of Physical Security Programs. In 2009, he was as deputy assistant secretary and assistant director for countermeasures. In 2014, President Barack Obama nominated Smith as Director of the Office of Foreign Missions.

On January 26, 2017, when Rex Tillerson, Donald Trump's nominee for United States Secretary of State, visited the United States State Department, Smith, Patrick F. Kennedy, Joyce Anne Barr, and Michele Bond were all simultaneously asked to resign.

In November 2020, Smith was named a volunteer member of the Joe Biden presidential transition Agency Review Team to support transition efforts related to the United States Department of State.

Personal life

Smith is married and has four children.

References

External links
A Conversation on Diplomacy U.S Ambassador Gentry O. Smith, February 18, 2016
PN131 - Nomination of Gentry O. Smith for Department of State, 114th Congress (2015-2016)

American diplomats
1959 births
Living people
North Carolina State University alumni
Obama administration personnel
Biden administration personnel
People from Weldon, North Carolina
United States Foreign Service personnel
African-American diplomats
Directors of the Office of Foreign Missions